Georges-Léonidas Dionne (9 September 1876 – 11 April 1946) was a Liberal party member of the House of Commons of Canada. He was born in Matane, Quebec and became a notary.

Dionne's education included studies at Rimouski Seminary and Université Laval.

He was first elected to Parliament at the Matane riding in the 1925 general election then re-elected there in 1926. After completing his second term, the 16th Canadian Parliament, Dionne was defeated by Henri LaRue of the Conservatives. Dionne made an unsuccessful attempt to return to Parliament as a Reconstruction Party candidate in the 1935 federal election at Matapédia—Matane.

References

External links
 

1876 births
1946 deaths
Liberal Party of Canada MPs
Members of the House of Commons of Canada from Quebec
People from Matane
Université Laval alumni